Brazil is the third-largest producer of wine in South America, behind Argentina and Chile; production in 2018 was , slightly more than New Zealand. In 2019, Brazil was the 15th largest wine producer in the world.  A substantial area is devoted to viticulture:  in 2018, though much of it produces table grapes rather than wine grapes.

The rest are American vines or hybrid vines, many of which are easier to cultivate under Brazilian growing conditions.

Climate and geography 

Brazil is located on the equator, though its enormous size and topographic variation mean that climate varies widely. While wine grapes are traditionally thought of as unsuitable for hot climates, winemaking has been successful both in equatorial climates as well as temperate ones.

Most of the wine production of Brazil is concentrated in the temperate south of the country, mostly in the state of Rio Grande do Sul, around the 29th parallel south, close to Uruguay and Argentina. Here many vineyards take advantage of cooler mesoclimates at higher elevations, to a large extent in the Serra Gaúcha ("Gaucho Highlands") region. Smaller-scale viticulture also takes place in the neighbouring state of Santa Catarina.

The São Francisco Valley in Pernambuco, which has a hot semi-arid climate, also has viticulture and winemaking activity, and is notable for being able to produce two crops of grapes each year.

History 

Several less successful attempts at introducing European vines into Brazil were made during the centuries. The first vines were brought to Brazil by the Portuguese in 1532, who planted them in the state São Paulo. Jesuits brought Spanish vines to Rio Grande do Sul in 1626, and 18th century settlers from the Azores brought vine cuttings from Madeira and the Azores. In 1840, plantations of Isabella (a cultivar of the species Vitis labrusca) on the south coast of Rio Grande are considered the first successful vine plantations in Brazil. By the late 1870s, winemaking was more definitely established and had taken hold in Serra Gaúcha, where Italian immigrants did much of the vine-growing, and mostly American vines were produced. Some Italian varieties and Tannat were later added.

Wine production with higher quality ambitions started in the 1970s, when several international wine companies such as Moet & Chandon invested in Brazil in the 1970s and brought in know-how and modern equipment.

References

See also
 Uruguay wine 
Argentina wine
Vitiviniculture in Paraná

 
Brazilian alcoholic drinks
Wine by country
Brazilian cuisine